American musician will.i.am has released four studio album, one compilation, 59 singles (including 42 as a featured artist), nine promotional singles, and 58 music videos.

will.i.am's debut album, Lost Change, was released in October 2001 on Atlantic Records. The album spawned one single, "I Am". His second studio album, Must B 21, was released on September 23, 2003. No singles were released from the album. His third album, Songs About Girls, was released on September 25, 2007. The album's first single was "I Got It from My Mama", which peaked at number 31 on the US Billboard Hot 100. The album also spawned the singles, "Heartbreaker" and "One More Chance". His fourth studio album, #willpower, was released on April 19, 2013. Will.i.am released the single "T.H.E. (The Hardest Ever)", featuring American singer Jennifer Lopez and British musician Mick Jagger in 2012. It peaked at number 36 on the Billboard Hot 100 and number three on the UK Singles Chart. Three singles have been released from #willpower: "This Is Love", topped the Irish and UK singles charts; "Scream & Shout" – a collaboration with American singer Britney Spears – which topped numerous singles charts worldwide and became his first solo single to reach the top 10 of the Billboard Hot 100, peaking at number three; and "#thatPOWER", with Canadian singer Justin Bieber.

Albums

Studio albums

Compilation albums

Singles

As lead artist

As featured artist

Promotional singles

Other charted and certified songs

Other guest appearances

Music videos

As lead artist

As featured artist

Guest appearances

Notes

See also
 will.i.am production discography
 The Black Eyed Peas discography

References

External links
 Official website
 
 
 

Discographies of American artists
Hip hop discographies
Pop music discographies